Leucettusa tubulosa is a species of calcareous sponge in the family Leucaltidae   first described by Arthur Dendy in 1924, and found in New Zealand waters, (with the type specimen found off the Three Kings).

Description 
Leucettusa tubulosa is a fused, tubular sponge, typically made up of a series of individuals sharing a common base. The slightly bulbous individuals are 8 mm in diameter, and up to 4 cm high.  The texture of the sponge is brittle and without elasticity.  It grows singly or in clusters, on rocky surfaces, ranging up to 85 m in depth. It is found off both the North and South Islands of New Zealand.

References

Invertebrates of New Zealand
Animals described in 1924
Taxa named by Arthur Dendy